Gregory Scott Reeves (born May 16, 1966) is an American actor and country music singer. His best known roles include Noel Laughlin on ABC's Nashville, Ryan McNeil on The Young and the Restless, and Steven Webber on General Hospital.

Musical career
Reeves and Aaron Benward founded the duo Blue County in 2003, which recorded one album for Curb Records. Aaron and Scott departed Curb in 2007 and continue to write and perform together all over the world, playing for fans ranging from 5 to 95. Reeves co-wrote Toby Keith's 2011 number 1 single, "Made in America". Between Blue County dates and movie/television roles, Reeves plays in the 80s cover rock band, "Port Chuck", along with General Hospital co-stars Steve Burton, Bradford Anderson, and Brandon Barash.

Personal life
Reeves was born in Santa Monica, to a family from Delight, Arkansas and Tennessee. Since March 1990, Reeves has been married to soap opera actress Melissa Reeves. They currently live in Franklin, Tennessee and have 2 children: Emily Taylor Reeves (born June 23, 1992) and Lawrence "Larry" David Reeves (born August 4, 1997).

Filmography

Awards and nominations
Daytime Emmy Awards
1997: Nominated, "Outstanding Supporting Actor in a Drama Series" – The Young and the Restless
1998: Nominated, "Outstanding Supporting Actor in a Drama Series" – The Young and the Restless

Soap Opera Digest Awards
1993: Nominated, "Outstanding Young Lead Actor" – The Young and the Restless
1994: Won, "Outstanding Young Lead Actor" – The Young and the Restless
1999: Nominated, "Outstanding Young Lead Actor" – The Young and the Restless

References

External links

Scott Reeves on Myspace

American country singer-songwriters
American male film actors
American male soap opera actors
Blue County (duo) members
People from Pike County, Arkansas
1966 births
Living people
Members of the Country Music Association
Male actors from Arkansas
Country musicians from Arkansas
Country musicians from California
20th-century American male actors
21st-century American male actors
Singer-songwriters from Arkansas
Singer-songwriters from California